Twill tape or twilled tape is a flat herringbone twill-woven fabric tape or ribbon of cotton, linen, polyester, or wool. It may be used in sewing and tailoring to reinforce seams, make casings, bind edges, and make sturdy ties for closing garments (for example, on hospital gowns). Twill tape is also used in theatre to tie curtains, cable and scenery to various objects, or to tie cable coils so that they do not unroll.

References 

Notions (sewing)
Seams